Blue Island, Illinois is a city in the United States. It may also refer to:

 Blue Island (1982 film), an Italian film
 Blue Island (2022 film), a Hong Kong documentary film
 Blue Island (novel), 1988 novel by Jean Raspail
 Blue Island–Vermont Street station, a Metra station in Blue Island, Illinois